The Manp'o Line is an electrified standard-gauge trunk line of the North Korean State Railway running from Sunch'ŏn on the P'yŏngra Line to Manp'o on the Pukpu Line. The line continues on from Manp'o to Ji'an, China.

Description
It also connects to the Kaech'ŏn, P'yŏngdŏk, Ch'ŏngnyŏn P'arwŏn, Unsan and Kanggye Lines.

The Manp'o Line runs in the northwestern part of Korea along the banks of the Ch'ŏngch'ŏn and Changja rivers. It is an important trunk line connecting ten cities, counties and districts in South P'yŏngan, North P'yŏngan and Chagang provinces. This connection is particularly important to the economies of North P'yŏngan and Chagang provinces; a great deal of coal is moved from mines along the Manp'o Line to various power plants and factories in the country.

With the exception of Sunch'ŏn station, which is administered by the P'yŏngyang Railway Bureau, the entirety of the Manp'o line from Chungp'yŏng to Manp'o is under the jurisdiction of the Kaech'ŏn Railway Bureau.

Due to the terrain it traverses, the Manp'o Line has a large number of tunnels, bridges and fills. There are 180 bridges totalling  in length, and 53 tunnels totalling  in length.  of the line - 41% of the total length - is laid with heavy rail, and 5% of the line is laid on concrete sleepers.

History

Pre-Liberation
The Kaech'ŏn–Ch'ŏndong section was originally a  narrow gauge line opened on 1 December 1918 by the Mitsui Mining Railway (미츠이 광산 전용 철도, Mich'ŭi Kwangsan Chŏn'yong Ch'ŏldo; 三井鉱山専用鉄道, Mitsui Kōzan Sen'yō Tetsudō) as an extension to its Sinanju–Kaech'ŏn mainline; in 1927 the company was renamed Kaech'ŏn Light Railway (개천 경변철도, Kaech'ŏn Kyŏngbyŏn Ch'ŏldo ; 价川軽便鉄道, Kaisen Keibentetsudō), and then was leased to the Chosen Government Railway (Sentetsu) on 1 November 1932. 

Sentetsu opened the  Sunch'ŏn–Ch'ŏndong line on 1 November 1932, and at the same time began converting the Kaech'ŏn–Ch'ŏndong section to standard gauge; this work was completed on 15 July 1933. On 1 September 1933 the two lines were merged and named the Manp'o Line, which on 15 October 1933 was extended with the opening of the  section from Kaech'ŏn to Kujang. Sentetsu subsequently extended the line several times, reaching Hŭich'ŏn on 1 November 1934 ( from Kujang), Kaego on 1 October 1935 ( from Hŭich'ŏn), Chŏnch'ŏn on 1 December 1936 ( from Kaego), and Kanggye on 1 December 1937, with a  section of line from Chŏnch'ŏn. The final section finishing the line,  from Kanggye to Manp'o, was opened on 1 February 1939.

After completing the entire line, Sentetsu opened the Ji'an Yalu River Border Railway Bridge on 31 July 1939, connecting the Manp'o Line to the Manchukuo National Railway's Meiji Line from Ji'an to Meihekou. New stations and branch lines along the line were also added: Ŏryong Station was opened on 1 May 1941, and from there, the Ryongmun Line on 1 September of that year; Ramjŏn Station was opened on 16 September 1941, and Chungsŏnggan Station was opened on 1 November 1942.

Post-Liberation
After the partition of Korea following the end of the Pacific War and the liberation of Korea, the entire line was located in North Korea and was nationalised by the Provisional People’s Committee for North Korea, along with all other railways in the Soviet occupation zone, on 10 August 1946, and subsequently becoming part of the Korean State Railway after the establishment of the DPRK.

In 1948, the electrification of the section from Kaegu to Koin was completed, but this was subsequently destroyed during the Korean War. The re-electrification of the line began in 1975 with the completion of the section from Hŭich'ŏn to Koin, followed by the Kaech'ŏn - Hŭich'ŏn section in 1979; the remaining sections, from Koin to Manp'o and from Kaech'ŏn to Sunch'ŏn, were completed in 1980.

Services

Freight
Freight trains serve the major industries along the line, such as textiles in Kanggye and rubber and cement plants in Manp'o. Coal and forest products are also important commodities shipped on this line. The line is also an important artery for freight traffic to and from China. Due to the large amount of coal shipped on the line, freight traffic towards Sunch'ŏn is three times greater than the amount of freight moved from Sunch'ŏn towards Manp'o.

Most of the coal traffic from Kujang towards Sunch'ŏn supplies Chagang Province with fuel; in the other direction, from Kujang towards Manp'o, coal shipped on the line is for local use for heating, and for large factories at Ch'agap'yŏng and Mun'ak on the Pukpu Line. 58% of all freight traffic between Kanggye and Manp'o is wood.

In terms of freight traffic, Kaech'ŏn and Kujang are the most important stations on the line. Kaech'ŏn is the starting point  of the Kaech'ŏn Line, which connects the Manp'o line to the P'yŏngŭi Line at Sinanju, and of a branch to the large colliery at Choyang. Other important coal mines in the area are at Ramjŏn, Pongch'ŏn Colliery and at Kaech'ŏn; this area accounts for 20% of the DPRK's anthracite production. Kujang, which is the point where the Manp'o Line connects to the P'yŏngdŏk and Ch'ŏngnyŏn P'alwŏn lines, is the location of a major cement factory that supplies much of North P'yŏngan province; cement is the major outbound commodity originating at Kujang.

Hŭich'ŏn, Chŏnch'ŏn and Kanggye are major loading points for freight from areas not served by rail. Hŭich'ŏn station is where freight from Tongsin County is transferred to trains, Kanggye station for freight from Usi, Chosan, Wiwŏn, Hwap'yŏng and Changgang counties, and Chŏnch'ŏn for freight from Kopung and Ryongrim counties.

Passenger

The following passenger trains are known to operate on this line and its branches:

 Express trains 15-16/17-18, operating between Haeju Ch'ŏngnyon and Manp'o Ch'ŏngnyŏn, run on this line between Sunch'ŏn and Manp'o;
 Express trains 19/20, operating between P'yŏngyang and Hŭich'ŏn Ch'ŏngnyŏn, run on this line between Sunch'ŏn and Hŭich'ŏn;
 Semi-express trains 124-125/126-127, operating between Sinŭiju Ch'ŏngnyŏn and Ch'ongjin Ch'ŏngnyŏn, run on this line between Kaech'ŏn and Sunch'ŏn;
 Semi-express trains 134-135/136-137, operating between Manp'o Ch'ŏngnyŏn and Hamhŭng, run on this line between Manp'o and Sunch'ŏn;
 Semi-express trains 138-139/140-141, operating between Manp'o Ch'ŏngnyŏn and Changyŏn, run on this line between Manp'o and Kujang;
 Long-distance stopping trains 250/251, operating between Sinŭiju Ch'ŏngnyŏn and Hŭich'ŏn Ch'ŏngnyŏn, run on this line between Kaech'ŏn and Hŭich'ŏn.

An international passenger service from Manp'o to Ji'an exists in the form of a single passenger car attached to the daily cross-border freight train. This train is not open to use by foreigners other than ethnic Koreans from China.

Commuter trains also operate on this line between Sunch'ŏn and Kaech'ŏn (four pairs), Kanggye and Chungsŏnggan (five pairs), Hŭich'ŏn Ch'ŏngnyŏn and Koin (two pairs) and Hŭich'ŏn Ch'ŏngnyŏn and Kaego Ch'ŏngnyŏn (one pair). These trains are intended to serve local workers, and stop at all stations.

Route
A yellow background in the "Distance" box indicates that section of the line is not electrified.

References
 Japanese Government Railways (1937), 鉄道停車場一覧. 昭和12年10月1日現在(The List of the Stations as of 1 October 1937), Kawaguchi Printing Company, Tokyo, p 497

Railway lines in North Korea
Standard gauge railways in North Korea